is a 1973 Japanese film in Nikkatsu's Roman porno series, directed by Yukihiro Sawada and starring Yuri Yamashina and Takeo Chii.

Synopsis
A group of five policemen engages in all sorts of corrupt activity including the rape of a girl resulting in her death. They rob a church of funds intended to go to Vietnamese refugees. During the investigation of the robbery, they use their position to frame a local teenage gang.

Cast
 Takeo Chii: Gorō Harada
 Yuri Yamashina: Mariko Shimizu
 Maki Kawamura: Kyōko Nakamura
 Hirokazu Inoue: Kenichi Nakamura
 Akira Takahashi: Keiji Katō
 Kōsuke Hisamatsu: Minister
 Sayori Shima: High school girl
 Masako Minami: High school girl
 Setsuko Ōyama: Prostitute

Background
Nikkatsu, still in the early stages of the difficulties associated with the trial over Love Hunter (1972), was reluctant to release a film about police brutality and corruption. The high-profile staff was able to convince the executives to green-light the production, but made one compromise with the title. The addition of the word "Wet" made the film sound more like a typical Roman Porno sex film than one that dealt with serious social issues. The media controversy over the film, as well as a condemnation from a Minister of Internal Affairs only served as free publicity for the film, and it became an immediate box-office hit. The film's influence went beyond the pink film genre. Many Japanese critics claim the film noir-style anti-hero in Japanese cinema—represented in films ranging from Kinji Fukasaku's Graveyard of Honor (1975) to the films of Takeshi Kitano—had its origins in Retreat Through the Wet Wasteland.

Director Yukihiro Sawada was known for his efforts in attempting to elevate Nikkatsu's Roman Porno films above their pink film origins, such as in his previous Sex Hunter: Wet Target (1972) and later Assault! (1976). He was particularly known for bringing social issues to the pink film, such as violence, racial prejudice and police corruption. Later in his career he brought the thriller genre into his Roman Pornos. Screenwriter Kazuhiko Hasegawa went on to direct the acclaimed The Man who Stole the Sun (1979).

Lead actress Yuri Yamashina had been an actress in the pink film genre before the inception of Nikkatsu's Roman Porno series in 1971. Acting under the name Saeko Tsugawa, she was associated with director Kan Mukai's studio, appearing for the director in such films as Cruel Story of a Sex Film Actress (1968). Yamashina had been featured in a few previous Roman Porno films, but her first starring film for Nikkatsu was Retreat Through the Wet Wasteland.

Availability
Retreat Through the Wet Wasteland was released theatrically in Japan on June 23, 1973. It was released on DVD in Japan on March 24, 2006, as part of Geneon's third wave of Nikkatsu Roman porno series.

Bibliography

English

Japanese

Notes

1973 films
1970s Japanese-language films
Nikkatsu films
Nikkatsu Roman Porno
1970s Japanese films